

Events
January 31 – John Stanfa, a Philadelphia crime family member and former driver of slain boss Angelo Bruno, is convicted in Federal District Court of lying to a grand jury investigating Bruno's murder.

Arts and literature
American Pop (film) 
Easy Street (non-fiction book) by Susan Berman.
Gangster Wars (film)  starring Michael Nouri, Joe Penny, Jonathan Banks, Robert Davi and Richard S. Castellano.
Thief (film)  starring James Caan.

Births

Deaths
March 15 – Philip C. Testa "Chicken Man", Philadelphia crime family Boss
April 23 – Stefano Bontade "The Prince", Palermo mafia Capo-Boss
May 5 – Philip "Phil Lucky" Giaccone, Bonanno crime family Capo
May 5 – Alphonse Indelicato "Sonny Red", Bonanno crime family caporegime
May 5 – Dominick "Big Trin" Trinchera, Bonanno crime family Capo
May 11 – Salvatore "The Heroin King" Inzerillo, Sicilian mafioso, Passo di Rigano Clan capo
May 27 – Chelsais Bouras "Steve", Philadelphia mobster and leader of the "Greek Mob"

References

Organized crime
Years in organized crime
In Organized Crime, 1981